Le voyage dans la lune is the sixth studio album by French electronic music duo Air, released on 6 February 2012 by Virgin Records.

Background and release
The album is inspired by the 1902 silent science fiction film A Trip to the Moon (Le voyage dans la lune) by Georges Méliès and is intended to be a soundtrack to the restored version of the film. A free three-minute film excerpt featuring the song "Sonic Armada" was made available for one week in early December 2011 in conjunction with a pre-order offer. A limited edition of the album (70,000 copies worldwide) includes the CD and a DVD of the film. The digital version of the album, along with the newly restored and colourised 16-minute film, was released as a strictly limited edition.

Track listing

Personnel
Credits adapted from the liner notes of Le voyage dans la lune.

Air
 Jean-Benoît Dunckel – Mellotron ; Wurlitzer ; piano ; synths ; vocals ; Solina, organ bass ; vibes ; drums 
 Nicolas Godin – timpani ; guitars ; synths ; harpsichord ; bass ; piano ; vocals ; Mellotron ; electric sitar ; percussions ; drums ; banjo, electric guitar

Additional musicians
 Vincent Taeger – drums 
 Isabelle Vuarnesson – cello 
 Victoria Legrand – vocals 
 Alex Thomas – drums 
 Au Revoir Simone – vocals

Technical
 Air – production
 Stéphane "Alf" Briat – mixing
 Louis Arlette – sound engineering
 Chab – mastering

Artwork
 Laurent Pinon – graphic design
 Georges Méliès – artwork

Charts

References

External links
 
 "Air's Safari to the Moon" – March 2012 interview with Air about the making of Le voyage dans la lune

2012 albums
Air (French band) albums
Alternative versions of soundtracks
Georges Méliès
Music based on works by Jules Verne
Virgin Records albums
Works based on From the Earth to the Moon